The Malter effect is named after Louis Malter, who first described the effect. Following exposure to ionizing radiation (e.g., electrons, ions, X-rays, extreme ultraviolet, vacuum ultraviolet), secondary electron emission from the surface of a thin insulating layer results in the establishment of a positive charge on the surface. This positive charge produces a high electric field in the insulator, resulting in the emission of electrons through the surface. This tends to pull more electrons from further beneath the surface. Eventually the sample replenishes the lost electrons, by picking up the collected secondary electrons through the ground loop.

The Malter effect often arises in wire chambers (aka drift chambers). After six years of operation, the BES III science team reported on a serious problem caused by the effect and how they coped with the problem.

References

Bibliography
 

Insulators